William Calder (1868 – 24 May 1936) was a Scottish footballer who played as a forward for Sheffield United, Gainsborough Trinity, Barnsley St. Peter's and Doncaster Rovers.

Playing career
Born in Edinburgh, Calder was the first new player to sign for Sheffield United after the initial formation of the club. He was signed in December 1889 after responding to the club's advertisements for players which had been published in Scotland. He played seven games for the Blades in the FA Cup and a handful of times in the Midland Counties League and the Northern League before being released in December 1891.

Calder then signed for Gainsborough Trinity in 1892 and also had a spell with Barnsley St. Peter's. He moved to play for Doncaster Rovers in 1893, remaining at the club till some time in the 1896−97 season when they won the Midland League, however he only played 3 times that season and didn't receive a medal.

Management career
Following his retirement from the game as a player, he settled in the town and in June 1920, as Rovers reformed following the war period, Calder offered them his services as "Honorary Manager", creating a team from the applications that had come in. This was the first time the term manager had been applied to a Rovers official.

Calder died suddenly at his Doncaster home in 1937, aged 67.

References

19th-century Scottish people
1868 births
1937 deaths
Footballers from Edinburgh
Association football forwards
Scottish footballers
Sheffield United F.C. players
Gainsborough Trinity F.C. players
Barnsley F.C. players
Doncaster Rovers F.C. players
Scottish football managers
Doncaster Rovers F.C. managers
Midland Football League players
Northern Football League players